Gary Don Rhodes, Ph.D., is an American writer, filmmaker, and film historian.  His work includes research on early 20th century films and key figures such as filmmakers and actors involved in the process.  He is best known for his contribution to classic horror films and his multiple biographies on Bela Lugosi.  Gary has also contributed to the filmmaking process with both documentaries and mockumentaries.  He is also a tenured faculty member in film studies at Queen's University Belfast.

Personal life
Born in Ardmore, Oklahoma on September 11, 1972, Rhodes is a member of the Cherokee tribe.  His books and films have been reviewed in such newspapers as USA Today and The Washington Times, trade publications like The Hollywood Reporter and American Cinematographer, magazines like Fangoria, Rue Morgue and Cineaste, journals like Film Quarterly and The Journal of Early Popular Visual Culture., and even Turner Classic Movies.

Scholarly work

Key research

Rhodes’ key research interests include American film exhibition, film genre, early cinema, and documentary filmmaking.  His scholarly journal essays on these subjects include:  “Irish-American Film Audiences, 1915-1930.”  Post Script, Summer 2013:  70-96; “The Film Company of Ireland and the Irish-American Press.”  Screening the Past No. 133, 2012; “Early Cinema and Oklahoma.”  The Chronicles of Oklahoma, Winter 2011-12:  388-429; “Reinventing a New Wheel:  The Films of Norman Mailer.”  The Mailer Review, Fall 2011:  170-182; “The Double Feature Evil:  Efforts to Eliminate the American Dual Bill.”  Film History:  An International Journal Vol. 23, No. 1, 2011:  57-74; “Drakula halála (1921):  The Cinema’s First Dracula.”  Horror Studies, Vol. 1, No. 1, 2010:  25-47; “The Origin, Development, and Controversy of the US Moving Picture Poster to 1915.”  Film History:  An International Journal, Vol. 19, No. 3, 2007:  228-246; and "Mockumentaries and the Production of Realist Horror."  Post Script, Fall 2002:  46-60.

Among his books are The Perils of Moviegoing in America, 1896-1950 (Bloomsbury/Continuum, 2011), which Kevin Brownlow heralded as “completely original”, and Emerald Illusions:  The Irish in Early American Cinema (Irish Academic Press, 2011), which the journal Film and History praised for its “exhaustive research and crystalline prose.”

Rhodes has edited such scholarly anthologies as Horror at the Drive-In:  Essays in Popular Americana (McFarland, 2003), which the Journal of Popular Culture called “impressive and considerable”; and Docufictions:  Essays on the Intersection of Documentary and Fictional Filmmaking (McFarland, 2005, with John Parris Springer), the first anthology on the subject of the mockumentary genre, which John Belton “recommended” in Choice.

Some of his other anthologies have concentrated on individual film directors, as in the case of Stanley Kubrick:  Essays into His Films and Legacy (McFarland, 2008); Edgar G. Ulmer:  Detour on Poverty Row (Lexington, 2008), which Senses of Cinema dubbed a “dynamic handbook,”; and The Films of Joseph H. Lewis (Wayne State UP, 2012), which Phil Robins of Cambridge University called a “welcome testament.”

Horror movies

Rhodes is probably best known for his work on horror cinema, which has appealed to scholarly and popular audiences, notably his star studies of actor Bela Lugosi.  In a book review for Fangoria, author David-Elijah Nahmod suggested that Rhodes “may be primarily responsible for the cult of Lugosi that exists today.”  According to Starbust magazine, "Scholar Gary D. Rhodes has spent his career debunking myths about classic horror cinema in general and Bela Lugosi’s life and work in particular. He has done this through meticulous research, leaving no stone unturned along the way."

His books in the area include Lugosi (McFarland, 1996), which Fangoria said “probably won’t be topped”; White Zombie:  Anatomy of a Horror Film (McFarland, 2001), which Bright Lights hailed as a benchmark for single-film studies; Bela Lugosi, Dreams and Nightmares (Collectables, 2006), which director Joe Dante called a “treasure trove”; No Traveler Returns:  The Lost Years of Bela Lugosi (BearManor Media, 2012, with Bill Kaffenberger; Tod Browning's Dracula (Tomahawk, 2014), which Sight & Sound praised for tackling the film “afresh,”;, Bela Lugosi in Person (BearManor Media, 2015, with Bill Kaffenberger), which Donald F. Glut called “incredibly well-researched,” and ED WOOD'S BRIDE OF THE MONSTER (BearManor Media 2015), and ED WOOD and the Lost LUGOSI Screenplays (BearManor Media, 2016).

Editor
As of 2014, Rhodes became series editor (with Robert Singer) of the ReFocus series of books on neglected American film directors, published by Edinburgh University Press.  He also sits on the editorial board of the peer-reviewed journal Horror Studies.

The Queen's University
At the Queen's University, Rhodes has served as director of film studies, co-director of film studies, and as MA convenor.  In 2015, The Guardian named film studies at Queen's as one of the top ten film programs in the United Kingdom.

Other works
In addition to his other work, Rhodes publishes fiction and poetry under pseudonyms and, occasionally, under his own name.  He has also booked jazz concerts in Oklahoma.

At present he is completing The Birth of the American Horror Film, a book that covers the subject to 1915, as well as a biography of William Fox.

Films

Documentaries

Rhodes’ early documentary films concentrated on the subject of jazz music.  His first film was Solo Flight:  The Genius of Charlie Christian (1992).  Directed by Rhodes when he was only eighteen years old, the film received positive reviews in such publications as The Christian Science Monitor, Booklist, Cadence, and The L.A. Jazz Scene.<ref>David Sterritt, “Out on Video,” Christian Science Monitor, January 17, 1997; James Scholtz, “Solo Flight,” Booklist, Vol. 93, No. 20, June 15, 1997; David McElfresh, “Video Critique,” Cadence, Vol 23, No. 6, June 1997; Scott Yanow, “Video Reviews,” 'The 'L.A. Jazz Scene, April 1997.</ref>  The making of the film not only revealed the location of Christian’s hitherto-unknown and unmarked burial spot, but it also raised funds for a historical marker to be placed upon the site.  Rhodes’ next film, Fiddlin’ Man:  The Life and Times of Bob Wills (1993), became a successful fundraiser for a number of PBS stations.   Downbeat lauded the film for “doing justice” to its legendary subject.

Rhodes’ other documentaries focus on the subject of film history, such as Lugosi:  Hollywood's Dracula (1999), a finalist at the Hollywood Film Festival in the year 2000.   SF Weekly called it “sublime.”  Then, his film Banned in Oklahoma (2005) chronicled an unfolding, five-year legal battle over the banning of Volker Schlöndorff’s The Tin Drum in Oklahoma.  In 2005, the Criterion Collection released Banned in Oklahoma on DVD with The Tin Drum (1979).  The documentary – which the Dallas Morning News called a “worthy mate” to the German masterpiece – also shared the award for best film at the 2004 Deadcenter Film Festival in Oklahoma.

Mockumentaries
Rhodes also directed the mockumentary film Chair (2000), and the fictional feature Wit's End'' (2005) starring Rue McClanahan, Darryl Cox, Udo Kier, and William Sanderson.

References

American non-fiction writers
American filmmakers
American film historians
Living people
Year of birth missing (living people)